Bling Empire is an American reality television series released on Netflix on January 15, 2021. The series focuses on the lives of wealthy, materialistic East and Southeast Asian Americans, socialites based in the Los Angeles area, described as real-life Crazy Rich Asians. It is the first American reality television series in which the main cast are all of East and Southeast Asian descent. On March 10, 2021, Netflix renewed the series for a second season which premiered on May 13, 2022. The third season premiered on October 5, 2022. The sister Netflix series, Bling Empire: New York, launched in January 2023.

Cast
Kevin Taejin Kreider – Male model born in South Korea but adopted and raised in Philadelphia. Kreider narrates the series for the audience. 
Kane Lim –  Real estate developer and investor from Singapore with family interests in real estate, shipping, oil and tankers 
Christine Chiu – Philanthropist, couture collector, and co-founder of Beverly Hills Plastic Surgery inc. In 2021, she competed in the thirtieth season of Dancing with the Stars. She was paired with Pasha Pashkov, they finished in fourteenth place after being eliminated in week 3.
Gabriel Chiu – Plastic surgeon and husband of Christine Chiu, and said to be a 24th direct descendant of the Song emperor.
Kelly Mi Li – Self-made entrepreneur and film producer born in China, who dated actor Andrew Gray in season 1
Anna Shay – Part-Japanese, part-Russian socialite whose fortune comes from selling her father's company Pacific Architects and Engineers
Cherie Chan – Denim heiress and former singer
Jessey Lee – Family business is in furniture
Kim Lee – DJ and former model, raised by her Vietnamese mother, but searches for her father in season 1
Andrew Gray – Kelly's boyfriend. Andrew is a model and an actor, who was best known for playing the Red Ranger in the 2013 show Power Rangers Megaforce.
Jaime Xie – Fashion influencer and model. She is the eldest daughter of Chinese-American tech businessman Ken Xie
Guy Tang – Hairdresser and singer-songwriter
 Mimi Morris (season 2)
 Dorothy Wang (season 2) – Youngest daughter of controversial Chinese-American businessman and slumlord billionaire Roger Wang

Episodes

Series overview

Season 1 (2021)

Season 2 (2022)

Season 3 (2022)

Reception
For the first season, review aggregator Rotten Tomatoes reported an approval rating of 90% based on 10 reviews, with an average rating of 6.7/10. The website's critics consensus reads, "Bling Empire may be another celebration of lavish wealth, but the focus on an Asian American cast gives this reality program an intriguing layer of cultural celebration."

Diane Gordon of TV Guide thought the television series was more than the "grotesque opulence" that it depicted, with compelling characters among the cast, some of whom were exploring their identity.  Eilidh Hargreaves of The Telegraph found the "epic rivalries", "ridiculous" problems, wild whims, "self-serving" philosophy of the main characters to be compulsive viewing and "deliciously odious to observe".

Spin-off
In October 2022, Netflix announced a New York City-set spin-off series Bling Empire: New York. It stars Dorothy Wang, who was a cast member in season 2 of the original series. The spin-off was released on January 20, 2023.

See also
 Singapore Social
 House of Ho

References

External links
 
 

2021 American television series debuts
2020s American reality television series
Television shows filmed in Los Angeles
Television shows set in Los Angeles
English-language Netflix original programming
Asian-American television
Asian-American culture in Los Angeles